Pseudodiptera is a genus of moths in the family Erebidae.

Species
Pseudodiptera alberici (Dufrane, 1945)
Pseudodiptera clypeatus (Kiriakoff, 1965)
Pseudodiptera dufranei (Kiriakoff, 1965)
Pseudodiptera musiforme Kaye, 1918

References

Natural History Museum Lepidoptera generic names catalog

Syntomini
Moth genera